Siliquariidae is a family of sea snails with unusual, very loosely coiled shells. These are marine gastropod molluscs in the clade Sorbeoconcha.

Taxonomy 
The following two subfamilies have been recognized in the taxonomy of Bouchet & Rocroi (2005):
Siliquariinae Anton, 1838 - synonym: Tenagodidae Gill, 1871
Stephopomatinae Bandel & Kowalke, 1997

Genera
Genera within the family Siliquariidae include:

Siliquariinae
 Siliquaria Bruguière, 1789
 Tenagodus Guettard, 1770

Stephopomatinae
 Hummelinckiella Faber & Moolenbeek, 1999
 Stephopoma Mörch, 1860

subfamily ?
 Caporbis Bartsch, 1915
 Petalopoma Schiaparelli, 2002

References

External links